Raslet is a mountain on the border of Øystre Slidre Municipality and Vang Municipality in Innlandet county, Norway. The mountain is surrounded by several other notable mountains including Rasletinden to the northwest, Nørdre Kalvehølotinden to the west, Bitihorn to the south, Gråhøi and Kvernhøi to the east, and Heimdalshøe to the northeast.

See also
List of mountains of Norway by height

References

Øystre Slidre
Vang, Innlandet
Mountains of Innlandet